Big Brother Brasil 20 was the twentieth season of Big Brother Brasil which premiered on January 21, 2020, on TV Globo. The show was produced by Endemol Shine and presented by Tiago Leifert.

The grand prize is R$1.5 million with tax allowances, plus a R$150.000 prize offered to the runner-up and a R$50.000 prize offered to the third placer.

The season originally featured 18 housemates divided into two groups of 9: "Celebrities", composed of actors, singers, professional athletes, and social media personalities, and "Civilians", composed of everyday Brazilians. On week 2, four new potential housemates entered the game as part of a twist, but only two of them actually moved into the house, bringing the total number of housemates up to 20.

On March 12, TV Globo suspended all live audiences for their shows due to the COVID-19 pandemic in Brazil. On March 16, or Day 56 inside the house, the housemates were notified of the current events outside of the house. The channel also moved the show's broadcast timeslot from 10:30 p.m. to 10:45 p.m. due to the extent of news coverage on their primetime national newscast. Sunday's live nominations shows were also moved from 11:30 p.m. to 11:00 p.m. due to the channel cutting some of their entertainment programs (such as the fifth season of The Voice Kids) for that day.

As of March 31, 2020, the season broke three worldwide voting records. Guilherme's eviction against Gizelly and Pyong on week 6 reached the mark of 416 million votes, surpassing the old mark of 202 million votes cast in the previous season. Pyong's eviction against Babu and Rafa on week 8 broke the record of simultaneous voting with 1.4 million votes cast per minute, with 385 million votes counted. Then, on week 10, a new record-breaking number of 1.5 billion votes resulted in Felipe's eviction against Manu and Mari, and entered the Guinness World Record for "Most public votes received by a television programme".

In order to celebrate the show's 20th season anniversary, competitions and twists from previous seasons were revived and scattered again throughout this season. The season was originally planned to last 94 days, the longest of the series, ending on April 23, 2020. On April 13, 2020, TV Globo announced that the season was extended in 4 days, with the live finale moved to April 27, 2020, for a total of 98 days.

On April 27, 2020, anesthesiologist Thelma Assis won the competition with 44.10% of the public vote over digital influencer Rafa Kalimann and actress & singer Manu Gavassi. According to Ibope (Brazilian Institute of Public Opinion and Statistics), this season had an average of 25 million views in the 15 largest metropolitan areas in Brazil, with a 43% share. This means that 4 out of 10 television sets in the country were tuned to the reality show. In addition, a total of 165 million people were reached during the three months that the program was aired.

The game

#FeedBBB 
This season, each housemate will be able to use a cellphone to capture moments in the house during a time determined by production. The cell phone will only allow them to post photos and videos to #FeedBBB and see what other housemates are saying about each other. It will not allow contact with the outside world.

Super HoH 
Along with its regular powers, this season the HoH will also be tasked with splitting their housemates into Haves and Have-Nots as well as choosing what and how much each group will be eating. This HoH will also be awarded their own private party at the end of their HoH reign.

The Wall 
On Day 1, 18 housemates entered the Big Brother house, divided by a wall with Celebrities on one side and Civilians on the other. The two groups were not able to see each other until the end of night 2, after the wall fell. Twist introduced in Big Brother Brasil 9.

Power of Veto 
In some weeks, the nominated housemates (excluding the HoH's nominee) compete against each other for one last chance to save themselves from eviction. Housemates nominated by the HoH are not eligible to compete and are guaranteed to face Brazil's vote. A re-worked version of a twist featured in the first week of Big Brother Brasil 18.

Glass House 
On Day 12, four additional housemates entered the Glass house where the public voted for two of them (one man and one woman) to move into the main House. Twist introduced in Big Brother Brasil 9, re-used in Big Brother Brasil 11 (featuring the first five evicted housemates from that season) and Big Brother Brasil 13.

White Room 
On Day 46, three housemates (Felipe, Gizelly and Manu) were chosen to enter the White Room, where they would stay until the live nominations on Day 48, unless one of them pressed the red button, thus becoming the first nominee of the week. A re-worked version of a twist introduced in Big Brother Brasil 9, re-used in Big Brother Brasil 10.

Big Phone 
Once in a while, the Big Phone rings, unleashing good or bad consequences on the nomination process for those who decide to answer it. Twist introduced in Big Brother Brasil 8, permanent from then onwards.

Power of No 
At the beginning of each week, the previous Head of Household may or may not be given the opportunity to disqualify some housemates from competing in the upcoming HoH competition. Twist introduced in Big Brother Brasil 12, permanent from then onwards.

The Counterattack 
Introduced this season, the counterattack is a surprise power given to either the HoH's nominee and/or the House's nominee, in which they have the opportunity to automatically nominate an additional housemate for eviction. While viewers are informed when the power will be featured in advance (on Thursdays before the Head of Household competition even takes place), the housemates are only informed about the twist on the spot, during Sunday's live nominations.

Housemates 

The cast list was unveiled on January 18, 2020.

Glass House housemates
The cast list was unveiled on January 31, 2020.

Future Appearances 

In 2021, Pyong Lee appeared as a contestant on the first season of Bake Off Celebridades 1, he finished in 3rd/4th place in the competition.

In 2021, Thelma Assis appeared on Big Brother Brasil 21 as a host in an activity.

In 2021, Guilherme Napolitano and Lucas Chumbo appeared in No Limite 5. Chumbo finished in 13th place, while Guilherme finished in 9th place.

In 2021, Pyong Lee appeared in Ilha Record, where he runner-up in the competition.

In 2022, Ivy Moraes, with her boyfriend Nandinho Borges, and Hadson Nery, with his wife Eliza Fagundes, appeared in Power Couple Brasil 6. Ivy & Nandinho finished in 8th place, while Hadson & Eliza finished in 5th place.

In 2022, Guilherme Napolitano appeared in Bake Off Celebridades 2, he finished in 15th place.

Voting history 
 Key
  – Civilians
  – Celebrities
  – Glass House Civilians

Notes

Have and Have-Nots

Ratings and reception

Brazilian ratings 
All numbers are in points and provided by Kantar Ibope Media.

 In 2020, each point represents 260.558 households in 15 market cities in Brazil (74.987 households in São Paulo).
 : This episode aired on a special time at 10:30 p.m.
 : This episode aired on a special time at 9:45 p.m.
 : This episode aired on a special time at 8:00 p.m.

References

External links 
 Official site 

20
2020 Brazilian television seasons
Television series impacted by the COVID-19 pandemic